Qohir Rasulzoda ( and ; born Abduqohir Abdurasulovich Nazirov, ; ; born 8 March 1959) is a Tajik politician who is serving as the Prime Minister of Tajikistan since 23 November 2013. He is a member of the People's Democratic Party of Tajikistan.

Political background
He was born as Abduqohir Abdurasulovich Nazirov on 8 March 1961 in the town of Kistakuz in Ghafurov District of Sughd Region of the Tajik SSR. In 1982, he graduated from the Agricultural University of Tajikistan, specializing in hydraulic engineering. Then Nazirov worked as engineer of the production department, chief engineer, chief of PMK-4, the head of the enterprise "Tajiksovskhozstroy."

From January 2000 to December 2006, he served as minister for melioration and water resources.

In 2008, he graduated from the Russian Presidential Academy of National Economy and Public Administration with a degree in Technical Science. On December 2, 2006, he was made the Acting Head of Sughd Province, becoming the permanent leader of the province on February 27, 2007. In May 2007, he changed his name to Qohir Rasulzoda under President Emomali Rahmon's law.

In December 2007 and in April 2010, Rasulzoda was elected as the first deputy chairman of National Assembly of the Supreme Assembly of Tajikistan.

On November 23, 2013, Qohir Rasulzoda was appointed Prime Minister of Tajikistan, replacing Oqil Oqilov.

Awards 

 Honored Worker of Tajikistan
 Order of the Defense Assistance Society of the CIS "For Outstanding Services" (2009)
 Order "For Selfless Service" (Uzbekistan, 2018) 
 Order of Honor (Russia, December 30, 2022)

References

1959 births
Living people
People's Democratic Party of Tajikistan politicians
Prime Ministers of Tajikistan
Tajikistani Muslims
People from Ghafurov